Jeff Dalgleish is an Australian rules football field umpire in the Australian Football League.

Based in Western Australia, Dalgleish began umpiring in 1999 in the East Fremantle Juniors and the Western Australian Amateur Football League. He progressed to professional football, making his WAFL umpiring debut in 2003 and his Australian Football League debut in 2009.

Dalgleish rose to become one of the league's best umpires in the mid-2010s, and was selected to umpire in his first Grand Final in 2015.

Dalgleish's brother Brett also umpires in the AFL as a boundary umpire.

Footnotes

Australian Football League umpires
West Australian Football League umpires
Living people
Year of birth missing (living people)